The 2010 IHF Super Globe was the fourth edition of the tournament. It was held in Doha, Qatar at Aspire Dome from May 17 to May 21.

BM Ciudad Real defeated the hosts Al Sadd SC in the final match by 30 - 25.

Teams

Schedule and results

Group A
All kick-off times are local (UTC+03:00).

Group B

Championship bracket

Semifinals

Fifth place game

Bronze Medal

Gold Medal

External links
Official website

2010 in handball
IHF Men's Super Globe
2010 in Qatari sport
Sports competitions in Doha
International handball competitions hosted by Qatar